Robert C. Myers is a Canadian theoretical physicist who specializes in black holes, string theory and quantum entanglement.

Career
Myers is Director of the Perimeter Institute for Theoretical Physics. where he holds the BMO Financial Group Isaac Newton Chair in Theoretical Physics. He served as Perimeter Institute's Faculty Chair from 2011 to 2018. He is also an Adjunct Professor of physics at the University of Waterloo.

Education
He was previously a professor at McGill University. He did his undergraduate studies at University of Waterloo, gained his PhD at Princeton University, and was a postdoctoral researcher at University of California, Santa Barbara.

Research and awards
Myers' research concerns quantum fields and strings, and quantum gravity. His work focuses on foundational questions in quantum theory and gravity. His contributions span a broad range, from foundational quantum field theory to gravitational physics, black holes, and cosmology.

Myers won the 2005 CAP-CRM Prize in Theoretical and Mathematical Physics "for his outstanding contributions to theoretical physics, ranging from aspects in gravitational physics to foundational aspects of string theory."

The Myers-Perry metric describes the higher-dimensional generalization of the Kerr metric.

Other awards Myers has won include the Canadian Association of Physicists' Herzberg Medal in 1999, the CAP-TRIUMF Vogt Medal in 2012, the Queen Elizabeth II Diamond Jubilee Medal, and the University of Waterloo Distinguished Alumni Award in 2018. In 2006, he was elected a Fellow of the Royal Society of Canada.

See also
 List of University of Waterloo people

References

Year of birth missing (living people)
Living people
Canadian string theorists
Academic staff of the University of Waterloo
Princeton University alumni